The following list contains the most-streamed songs on the audio streaming platform Spotify.

Canadian singer Justin Bieber has the most songs in the top 100 most-streamed songs list with six entries, while English-Albanian singer Dua Lipa has the most songs in the top 100 for a female artist with four entries.

Prior to February 2014, Spotify's most-streamed song was "Radioactive" by American pop band Imagine Dragons. Since then, six songs have claimed the top ranking, the longest time being "Shape of You" by English singer-songwriter Ed Sheeran.

100 most-streamed songs
The following table lists the top 100 most-streamed songs on Spotify, with streams rounded to the nearest million, as well as the artist(s) and the date it was released.

Artists with the most songs in the top 100

Historical most-streamed songs

Milestones and achievements for songs

Weekly number-one songs

Spotify Charts 
The following table lists the songs that reached number one on Spotify's weekly most-played chart. The table records the number one song starting from issue date 29 December 2016 as the data before that said date is not available on the Official Spotify Weekly Charts. "TQG" by Karol G and Shakira is the current number-one song on the Spotify Global Top 200 for the week ending 9 March 2023.

Before Spotify Charts 
The following table lists the songs that reached the number one position before the existence of Spotify's most played weekly chart. The table records the number one song as of the issue date of 29 September 2013, as data prior to that date is not available. "Starboy" by The Weeknd featuring Daft Punk was the last number one song before the existence of the Spotify Global Top 200, until 29 December 2016.

Annual top five most-streamed songs
 
The following table lists the five songs that Spotify reported as most-played in each calendar year.

The following table lists the top song that Spotify reported as most-played in each calendar year, for the years 2008 to 2011.

Most-streamed songs in a single day
The following table lists the 20 songs to get the most streams in a single day, as registered on Spotify Global Daily chart.

Most-streamed songs in a single week
The following table lists the top 20 most-streamed in a single week, as registered on the Spotify Global Weekly chart.

Longest-running number-one songs by days
The following table lists the songs with more than 50 days in the number 1 position on the Global Spotify Chart.

10 most-streamed albums

As of February 2023, "÷ (Deluxe)" by English singer-songwriter Ed Sheeran is the most-streamed album of all time on Spotify, while "Dua Lipa (Complete Edition)" by English-Albanian singer Dua Lipa is the most-streamed album by a female artist.

On 23 January 2021, it was announced that Sheeran’s ÷ had become the first album to surpass 10 billion streams on Spotify.

The following table lists the top 10 most-streamed albums on Spotify, with streams rounded to the nearest million, as well as the number of tracks, the artist and the date it was released.

Milestones and achievements for albums

Annual top five most-streamed albums

The following table lists the five albums that Spotify reported as most-played in each calendar year.

Most streamed albums in a single day 

The following table lists the most streamed albums in a single day, registering the total of obtained streams, the artist, the publication of the album and the date in which these streams were reached.

Most streamed albums in a single week 
The following table lists the most streamed albums in a single week, registering the total of obtained streams, the artist, the publication of the album and the date in which these streams were reached.

See also

 List of most-streamed artists on Spotify
 List of most-viewed YouTube videos
 List of most-liked YouTube videos
 List of most-disliked YouTube videos
 List of most-subscribed YouTube channels
 List of most-subscribed YouTube Music artists
 List of most-followed Facebook pages
 List of most-liked Instagram posts
 List of most-followed Instagram accounts
 List of most-followed TikTok accounts
 List of most-liked TikTok videos
 List of most-followed Twitch channels
 List of most-followed Twitter accounts
 List of most-viewed online videos in the first 24 hours

Notes

References

Spotify most streamed
Spotify Most Streamed
Spotify Most Streamed
Spotyfy songs
Spotify